State Highway 291 (SH 291) is a  state highway in Chaffee County, Colorado, United States, that connects U.S. Route 50 (US 50) in Salida with U.S. Route 285 (US 285) north of Poncha Springs.

Route description

SH 291 begins at a T intersection with US 50 in Salida. From it southern terminus, it travels north as Oak Street. It then turns northwest to become 1st Street as it passes through Salida's historic downtown, paralleling the Arkansas River.

Major intersections

Sed also

 List of state highways in Colorado

References

External links

291
Transportation in Chaffee County, Colorado